Several municipalities in the Canadian province of Quebec held municipal elections to elect mayors and councillors on November 2, 1997. The most closely watched contest was in Quebec City, where incumbent mayor Jean-Paul L'Allier was re-elected, although his supporters lost control of city council to the Civic Progress Party.

Results

Verdun
Party colours have been randomly chosen and do not indicate affiliation with or resemblance to any municipal, provincial, or federal party.

Source: "Results from races for mayor, council," Montreal Gazette 3 November 1997, A6.

References

 
1997